Events from the year 1668 in China.

Incumbents 
 Kangxi Emperor (7th year)
 Regents — Ebilun and Oboi

Viceroys
 Viceroy of Zhili, Shandong and Henan — Zhu Changzuo (–January 8), Bai Bingzhen (January 27–)
 Viceroy of Zhejiang — Zhao Tingchen
 Viceroy of Fujian — Zhang Chaolin 
 Viceroy of Huguang — Zhang Changgeng, Liu Zhaoqi	
 Viceroy of Shan-Shaan — Moluo
 Viceroy of Liangguang — Zhou Youde, Jin Guangzu
 Viceroy of Yun-Gui — Bian Sanyuan, Gan Wenkun
 Viceroy of Sichuan (Chuan-Hu) — Liu Zhaoqi
 Viceroy of Liangjiang —  Lang Tingzuo (– December 17)

Events 
 The Qing government decreed a prohibition of non-Eight Banner people getting into Northeast China. Han Chinese were banned from settling in this region but the rule was openly violated and Han Chinese became a majority in urban areas by the early 19th century.
 Tianhou Temple (Anping) built in Taiwan
 July 25 — 50,000+ killed in the 8.5 magnitude 1668 Tancheng earthquake in Shandong
 The contents of the national treasury totals 14,930,000 taels
 The Qing revoke the trading privileges of the Dutch
 The Imperial Edict banning footbinding is revoked when determined to be unenforceable
 Sino-Russian border conflicts

Births 
 Imperial Noble Consort Quehui (1668 – 24 April 1743), of the Manchu Bordered Yellow Banner Tunggiya clan, was a consort of the Kangxi Emperor

Deaths 
 Fang Weiyi (1585-1668, 方維儀) a Chinese poet, calligrapher, painter and literature historian

References

 
 .

 
China